The Mysteries of Laura is an American police procedural comedy-drama television series that premiered on September 17, 2014 on NBC. It was developed by Jeff Rake, who also serves as an executive producer. The series, which stars Debra Messing as Detective Laura Diamond, was originally adapted from a Spanish television series Los misterios de Laura by Carlos Vila, Javier Holgado, and Gregorio Quintana de Uña.
On May 8, 2015, NBC renewed The Mysteries of Laura for a second season of 13 episodes, which premiered on September 23, 2015. On November 9, 2015, NBC ordered three additional episodes for the second season. On May 14, 2016, NBC canceled the series after two seasons.

Plot
The series follows the life of Laura Diamond, a homicide detective with the NYPD's 2nd Precinct, who balances her day job with her off-duty hours as a single mother to twin sons. Meanwhile, she is trying to get Captain Jake Broderick, her soon-to-be-former-husband, who is also her boss, to sign the divorce papers. After he finally signs them, Laura re-enters the dating world, and after a rough start, finds herself attracted to Tony Abbott, a chef and food truck owner who she encounters on a case. He makes excuses to see her. At the end of the first season, Capt. Broderick is shot and grievously wounded during a convenience store robbery. While in the hospital, he admits to Laura that despite everything he is still deeply in love with her, but due to severe head trauma, forgets he did this, leaving only Laura knowing.

Jake recovers, but at the beginning of the second season, the precinct has a new captain, Nancy Santiani, a stern, by-the-book taskmaster who immediately rubs the detectives the wrong way. Rather than transfer to another precinct, Broderick voluntarily takes a demotion to Senior Detective and partners with Laura, while Detective Billy Soto teams up with Detective Meredith Bose, with whom he has begun a relationship. Bose's previous partner, Frankie Pulaski, appears only in season one with the only explanation given for her departure being that she was not "senior enough" to stay in the position she accepted. The tone of the series was also altered in season two. Comedic elements, such as the rowdy behavior of Laura's boys, were reduced, while some focus was shifted to the triangle that develops between Laura, Jake, and Laura's new love interest Tony.

Cast

Main
 Debra Messing as Detective Laura Diamond, the show's title character and chief protagonist.
 Josh Lucas as Captain Jake Broderick, Laura's former husband who was promoted to captain of her precinct at the start of the series. After being wounded in action, Jake takes a demotion to Senior Detective and becomes Laura's partner.
 Laz Alonso as Detective Billy Soto, Laura's initial partner, and later Detective Bose's partner/lover.
 Janina Gavankar as Detective Meredith Bose, a detective colleague of Laura and Billy's.
 Max Jenkins as Max Spencer Carnegie, the 2nd Precinct's independently wealthy intern.
 Meg Steedle as Detective Francesca "Frankie" Pulaski, who is from Eau Claire, Wisconsin and becomes Detective Bose's partner for a while (season 1, episodes 15–22).

Recurring
 Robert Klein as Leo Diamond, Laura and Lucy's father and the grandfather of Nicholas and Harrison.
 Charles and Vincent Reina as Nicholas and Harrison Broderick respectively, two rambunctious twin boys who are the sons of Laura and Jake, the grandsons of Leo, and the nephews of Lucy.
 Alysia Joy Powell as Alicia, the nanny/housekeeper for Laura's and Jake's sons.
 Neal Bledsoe as Tony Abbott, a food truck owner and Laura's first serious boyfriend after divorcing Jake. Tony gets a job offer in Las Vegas and the two break up later in season 2.
 Callie Thorne as Captain Nancy Santiani (season 2), a by-the-book female who becomes the new captain at the precinct after Jake was wounded. She is later sniped and killed at the end of "The Mystery of the Unknown Caller."
 Enrico Colantoni as Dan Hauser, the police captain before Jake who was previously arrested and is currently in prison. Dan was known for nearly killing Laura. He briefly escaped in "The Mystery of the Convict Mentor" only to be apprehended by Laura. Dan later returned in "The Mystery of the Dark Heart" to help Laura's group investigate a murder done by a serial killer that Dan previously investigated.
 Stockard Channing as Brenda Phillips (season 2), the "shark in heels" in-house counsel of a perfume company.
 Jenna Fischer as Jennifer Lambert (season 2), a prosecutor and a new love interest for Jake. In the season 2 finale, Jennifer accepts Jake's marriage proposal just before Laura reveals she wants Jake back in her life.
 Debby Ryan as Lucy Diamond (season 2), Laura's trouble-making younger paternal half-sister and the half-aunt of Nicholas and Harrison. She is the daughter of Leo and a paralegal that Leo had an affair with.

Episodes

Production
The series was originally adapted from a Spanish television series, Los misterios de Laura, by Carlos Vila and Javier Holgado. The American version was developed by Jeff Rake with Vila and Holgado. Rake also serves as an executive producer with Aaron Kaplan, Greg Berlanti for Berlanti Productions, Todd Lituchy and McG for Warner Bros. Television. The show was primarily filmed in New York City. Brooklyn's 78th Precinct was used for exterior shots of the 2nd Precinct.

It debuted on NBC during the 2014–15 television season, where it aired on Wednesday nights at 8 pm (ET/PT)/7 pm (CT). The series premiered on September 24, 2014. A preview aired beforehand on September 17, 2014, following the season finale of America's Got Talent.

Reception

Ratings
The September 17, 2014, premiere drew a 2.0 rating in the 18–49 demographic and 10.2 million total viewers, in a special time slot leading out of the America's Got Talent season finale. It was the most-watched broadcast premiere of a series since March 2014. The regular-slot debut at 8 pm Eastern time on September 24, 2014, drew a 1.5 rating in the 18–49 demo and 9.9 million viewers overall.

Although it dropped 25% in the 18–49 demo, it retained 97% of its total viewers of the previous week's preview. In total viewers, this was NBC's best result with in-season regularly scheduled programming versus all regularly scheduled competition in that time period in more than five years.

Critical reception
The Mysteries of Laura received generally negative reviews from critics. The review aggregator website Rotten Tomatoes reported a 22% approval rating with an average rating of 4.2/10 based on 41 reviews for the first season. The website's consensus reads, "Despite a talented cast, The Mysteries of Laura is dated both as a cop show and as a representation of single, working mothers."

On Metacritic, the show has a score of 37 out of 100, based on 28 critics, indicating "generally unfavorable reviews".

Emilie Aries, however, called Messing's new character "the best depiction of women on the small screen".

Accolades

Broadcast
In Canada, the show was simulcast with the American airing on CTV and is also rerun on M3. In New Zealand, it premiered on January 12, 2015, on TV2.

In the United Kingdom and Ireland, The Mysteries of Laura was picked up by 5 USA on December 22, 2014, and premiered on January 20, 2015. In Germany, the show is known as Detective Laura Diamond, broadcast on Sat.1 since February 2, 2015. In Latin America, the show airs on Warner Channel, premiering on May 25, 2015.

In Australia, the series premiered on July 29, 2015, on the Nine Network. The first season has also been acquired in France by TF1. In India, the series is acquired by Zee Café, which premiered the show on July 24, 2015, at 11:00 pm IST with the Season 1 finale airing on August 26, 2015.

References

External links
 
 

2010s American comedy-drama television series
2010s American crime drama television series
2010s American mystery television series
2010s American police comedy television series
2014 American television series debuts
2016 American television series endings
American television series based on Spanish television series
English-language television shows
Fictional portrayals of the New York City Police Department
NBC original programming
Television series by Warner Bros. Television Studios
Television shows set in New York City
Television shows filmed in New York (state)
Television series by Kapital Entertainment